The 1913 West Virginia Mountaineers football team was an American football team that represented West Virginia University as an independent during the 1913 college football season. In its first and only season under head coach Edwin Sweetland, the team compiled a 3–4–2 record and was outscored by a total of 137 to 109. Melville Boyles was the team captain.

Schedule

References

West Virginia
West Virginia Mountaineers football seasons
West Virginia Mountaineers football